Gastrodontoidea is a taxonomic superfamily of air-breathing land snails, terrestrial pulmonate gastropod mollusks in the limacoid clade.

Taxonomy
According to the taxonomy of the Gastropoda (Bouchet & Rocroi, 2005), families in this superfamily include:

 Gastrodontidae
 Chronidae
 Euconulidae
 Oxychilidae
 Pristilomatidae
 Trochomorphidae
 Fossil taxa probably belonging to the Gastrodontoidea are:
 Subfamily † Archaeozonitinae Pfeffer, 1930
 † Archaeozonites Sandberger, 1873 - type genus of Archaeozonitinae
 Subfamily † Grandipatulinae Pfeffer, 1930
 † Grandipatula Cossmann, 1889 - type genus of Grandipatulinae
 Subfamily † Palaeoxestininae Pfeffer, 1930
 † Palaeoxestina Wenz, 1919 - type genus of Palaeoxestininae

Cladogram 
The following cladogram shows the phylogenic relationships of this superfamily with the other superfamilies and families within the limacoid clade:

References 

Stylommatophora
Gastropod superfamilies
Taxa named by George Washington Tryon